The Meredith Vieira Show was an American talk show that was hosted by Meredith Vieira and produced by NBCUniversal Television Distribution. It premiered on September 8, 2014, and was airing in syndication. The second and final season premiered on September 8, 2015.

NBCUniversal canceled the show after two seasons because of low ratings. The final show aired on May 20, 2016.

Production
In July 2013, NBCUniversal Television Distribution ordered The Meredith Vieira Show, with a fall 2014 premiere.

Everett Bradley served as show's band leader before the band was removed, with Jon Harris as announcer. The Meredith Vieira Show was sold to local stations in 98% of the United States. NBCUniversal Television renewed the show for a second season. By season two, the show switched to a live format and. A new panel segment called What's Hot Now! was moderated by Vieira and took up a large portion of each episode; the panelists were Lance Bass, Lilliana Vazquez, Yamaneika Saunders, and Megan Colarossi.

The show originated from Studio 6-A at NBC's Rockefeller Center headquarters, previously the home to the network's Late Night.

On January 5, 2016, NBCUniversal announced that it was not renewing the show, citing a ratings decline, downgrades from local stations, and Vieira's work schedule. Vieira noted in a statement, "I am so sorry to see our show come to an end after this season, but I am also incredibly proud of the work our staff has done and forever grateful to our supportive viewers," and added, "We promise to spend our final weeks producing the best broadcast we know how. And have a blast doing so!"

References

External links

2010s American television talk shows
2014 American television series debuts
2016 American television series endings
English-language television shows
First-run syndicated television programs in the United States
Television series by Universal Television